Mount Regan, rises  above sea level, and is a peak in the Sawtooth Range of Idaho. The peak is located in the Sawtooth Wilderness of Sawtooth National Recreation Area on the border of Boise and Custer counties. The peak is named after Timothy Regan, a pioneer who lived in Silver City, and then Boise. Mount Regan is located at the southern end of Sawtooth Lake. The Trailer Lakes and Regan Lake are located northwest of the peak, and the Trail Creek Lakes are west of the peak.

References

External links

Mountains of Boise County, Idaho
Regan
Regan
Sawtooth Wilderness